The 2001 Eurocard Ladies German Open was a women's tennis tournament played on outdoor clay courts at the Rot-Weiss Tennis Club in Berlin in Germany and was part of Tier I of the 2001 WTA Tour. It was the 32nd edition of the tournament and ran from 7 May through 13 May 2001. Fourth-seeded Amélie Mauresmo won the singles title.

Finals

Singles

 Amélie Mauresmo defeated  Jennifer Capriati 6–4, 2–6, 6–3
 It was Mauresmo's 4th title of the year and the 7th of her career.

Doubles

 Els Callens /  Meghann Shaughnessy defeated  Cara Black /  Elena Likhovtseva 6–4, 6–3
 It was Callens' 1st title of the year and the 5th of her career. It was Shaughnessy's 1st title of the year and the 3rd of her career.

Prize money

External links
 ITF tournament edition details
 Tournament draws

Eurocard Ladies German Open
WTA German Open
Eurocard Ladies German Open